This is a list of people from Topeka, Kansas.

Academia

 Warren Faidley (1957- ), meteorologist, storm chaser 
 Riley Gardner (1921-2007), psychologist
 Wes Jackson (1936- ), environmentalist, The Land Institute
 Sokoni Karanja (1940- ), child development expert 
 G. Warren Nutter (1923-1979), economist
 Ruth Patrick (1907-2013), botanist, limnologist
 Julius Rebek (1944- ), chemist 
 Walton T. Roth (1939- ), psychiatrist and psychophysiological researcher
 David Curtis Skaggs, Jr. (1937- ), historian
 John Brooks Slaughter (1934- ), electrical engineer, National Science Foundation director

Arts and entertainment

Film, television, and theatre

 Brandon Adams (1979- ), actor
 Annette Bening (1958- ), actress 
 Gregg Binkley (1963- ), actor
 Roscoe Born (1950-2020), actor
 Alicia Cabrera (1978- ), actress, Miss Kansas USA 2003 
 Jack Colvin (1934-2005), actor 
 Samuel M. Comer (1893-1974), set decorator
 George Dickerson (1933-2015), actor, poet, writer
 Jayne Houdyshell (1953- ), actress
 Jeff Kready, Broadway actor
 Ted North (1916-1975), actor
 Sheila Ryan (1921-1975), actress
 Travis Schuldt (1974- ), actor
 Lois Smith (1930- ), actress
 Fay Tincher (1884-1983), actress

Journalism
 Elizabeth Farnsworth (1943- ), broadcaster, filmmaker
Donald C. Thompson (1885-1947), war photographer, director, producer

Literature

 Thomas Fox Averill (1949- ), novelist
 Gwendolyn Brooks (1917-2000), poet
Irene Bennett Brown, American author of children's, young adult and adult fiction
 Jeannette Eyerly (1908-2008), novelist, columnist
 Janet Fox (1940-2009), fantasy and horror writer, poet
 Jane Heap (1883-1964), editor, publisher
 Ben Lerner (1979- ), poet 
 Karen Salyer McElmurray (1956- ), essayist, novelist
 Eric McHenry (1972- ), poet
 Frances Clarke Sayers (1897-1989), author, lecturer, librarian 
 Ed Skoog (1971- ), poet
 Linda Spalding (1943- ), novelist, editor
 Rex Stout (1886-1975), novelist
 Max Yoho (1934-2017), author
 Kevin Young (1970/1971- ), poet, author, Director of the National Museum of African American History and Culture

Music

 Phil Ehart (1950-), drummer, founding member of the band Kansas
 Streamline Ewing (1917-2002), jazz trombonist
 Aulsondro "Emcee N.I.C.E." Hamilton, musician, member of KansasCali, known for Crash soundtrack
 Coleman Hawkins (1904-1969), jazz saxophonist 
 Dave Hope (1949- ), bass guitarist, former member of Kansas
 Josh Kulick, former heavy metal drummer for Through The Eyes Of The Dead
 Katrina Leskanich (1960- ), singer (Katrina and the Waves)
 Kerry Livgren (1949- ), founding member of the bands Kansas and AD
 Andy McKee (1979- ), musician
 Kirke Mechem (1925- ), composer
 Origin, metal band
 Kliph Scurlock (1973- ), drummer
 Jamshied Sharifi (1960- ), composer, musician
 Kenny Starr (1952- ), country singer
 Rich Williams (1950- ), guitarist, member of Kansas

Other visual arts
 James Pringle Cook (1947- ), Western landscape painter
 Aaron Douglas (1899-1979), Harlem Renaissance artist
 Georgia Louise Harris Brown (1918-1999), architect 
 Peter Max Lawrence (1977- ), contemporary media artist

Business
 Brad Garlinghouse (1971- ), business executive, investor
 Cyrus K. Holliday (1826-1900), first president of Atchison, Topeka & Santa Fe railroad; founder of Topeka township
 John F. Kilmartin (1921-2004), retail executive

Crime
 Alvin "Creepy" Karpis (1907-1979), kidnapper, murderer, robber
 Amy Watkins (1973-1999), murder victim

Medicine
 Karl Bowman (1888-1973), psychiatrist
 Harriet Lerner (1944- ), clinical psychologist and author 
 Karl Menninger (1893-1990), psychiatrist 
 Roy W. Menninger (1926- ), psychiatrist
 William C. Menninger (1899-1966), psychiatrist 
 W. Walter Menninger (1931- ), psychiatrist
 Karl Targownik (1915-1996), psychiatrist and Holocaust survivor

Military
 Wilder D. Baker (1890-1975), U.S. Navy Vice Admiral during World War II 
 Ronald Evans (1933-1990), astronaut
 Harry D. Felt (1902-1992), U.S. Navy Admiral
 Donald Hudson (1895-1967), World War I flying ace
 Philip Johnston (1892-1978), U.S. Marine Corps code-talker
 Frank E. Petersen (1932-2015), U.S. Marine Corps Lt. General

Politics

National

 Linda Carol Brown (1943-2018), plaintiff in Brown v. Board of Education
 Oliver Brown (1918-1961), plaintiff in Brown v. Board of Education
 Arthur Capper (1865-1951), U.S. Senator from Kansas, 20th Governor of Kansas
 Helen Chenoweth-Hage (1938-2006), U.S. Representative from Idaho
 Albert M. Cole (1901-1994), U.S. Representative from Kansas
 Sam A. Crow (1926-2022), U.S. federal judge
 Charles Curtis (1860-1936), 31st Vice President of the United States
 Harry W. Fraser (1884-1950), labor leader
 David Archibald Harvey (1845-1916), U.S. House Delegate from Oklahoma Territory
 Donald R. Heath (1894-1981), U.S. Ambassador to Cambodia, Laos, Lebanon, Saudi Arabia, and Vietnam
 Zelma Henderson (1920-2008), plaintiff in Brown v. Board of Education
 Nancy Kassebaum (1932- ), U.S. Senator from Kansas
 Alf Landon (1887-1987), 26th Governor of Kansas, 1936 Republican candidate for U.S. President
 John Thomas Marten (1951- ), U.S. federal judge
 John Martin (1833-1913), U.S. Senator from Kansas
 Isabell Masters (1913-2011), perennial third-party candidate for U.S. president
 Noah C. McFarland (1822-1897), Commissioner of the General Land Office
 John G. Otis (1838-1916), U.S. Representative from Kansas
 Brad Parscale (1976- ), campaign manager for Donald Trump
 Nathan Phelps (1958- ), LGBT rights activist
 Shirley Phelps-Roper (1957- ), lawyer, anti-LGBT political activist
 John Ritchie (1817-1887), abolitionist
 Pat Roberts (1936- ), U.S. Senator from Kansas
 William R. Roy (1926-2014), U.S. Representative from Kansas
 Thomas Ryan (1837-1914), U.S. Representative from Kansas and Ambassador to Mexico 
 John States Seybold (1897-1982), Governor of Panama Canal Zone
 Jim Slattery (1948- ), U.S. Representative from Kansas
 John L. Waller (1850-1907), U.S. Consul to Madagascar

State

 John Alcala (1959- ), Kansas state legislator
 Carol A. Beier (1958- ), Kansas Supreme Court Justice 
 Robert Coldsnow (1924-2014), Kansas state legislator
 Robert E. Davis (1939-2010), Kansas Supreme Court Chief Justice
 Ron Estes (1956- ), 39th Treasurer of Kansas and 4th Congressional District Representative, elected 2017.
 Joan Finney (1925-2001), 42nd Governor of Kansas 
 Shanti Gandhi (1940- ), physician and legislator 
 A. C. Hamlin (1881-1912), Oklahoma state legislator
 Alexander Miller Harvey (1867-1928), 15th Lieutenant Governor of Kansas
 Anthony Hensley (1953- ), Kansas state legislator
 Marla Luckert (1955- ), Kansas Supreme Court justice
 Lutie Lytle (1875-1950), lawyer, 1st African-American woman admitted to Kansas bar
 Kay McFarland (1935-2015), Kansas Supreme Court Chief Justice
 Eric Rosen (1953- ), Kansas Supreme Court Justice 
 Caleb Stegall (1971- ), Kansas Supreme Court Justice
 Jeff Stone (1961- ), Wisconsin state legislator
 Clifford W. Trow (1929- ), Oregon state legislator
 William C. Webb (1824-1898), Wisconsin and Kansas legislator
 Jackie Winters (1937-2019), Oregon state legislator

Local

 Jacob Alan Dickinson (1911-1971), Topeka Board of Education president, desegregation supporter

Religion
 Fred Phelps (1929-2014), leader of the Westboro Baptist Church 
 Charles Sheldon (1857-1946), minister, author

Sports

American football

 Chris Beatty (1973- ), coach
 Tom Dinkel (1956- ), linebacker
 Forrestal Hickman (1993- ), offensive tackle
 Teven Jenkins (1998- ), offensive tackle
 Mike Lemon (1951- ), linebacker
 Trey Lewis (1985- ), defensive tackle 
 Lamar Mady (1990- ), center
 Larry McGinnis (1899-1948), guard
 Jack Nason (1899-1977), tackle, wingback
 John H. Outland (1871-1947), college football coach and namesake of Outland Trophy 
 John Parrella (1969- ), defensive tackle
 Ryan Torain (1986- ), running back
 Chuck Washington (1964- ), defensive back
 Troy Wilson (1970- ), defensive end

Baseball

 Aaron Crow (1986- ), pitcher 
 Rick DeHart (1970- ), pitcher
 Bingo DeMoss (1889-1965), 2nd baseman, manager
 Art Griggs (1884-1938), 1st baseman
 Ross Grimsley (1950- ), pitcher
 Clarence Heise (1907-1999), pitcher
 Bernadine Maxwell (d. 1988), utility player
 Larry Miller (1937-2018), pitcher
 Dink Mothell (1897-1980), pitcher, utility player
 Don O'Riley (1945-1997), pitcher
 Scott Taylor (1966- ), pitcher
 Mike Torrez (1946- ), pitcher

Basketball
 Chris Babb (1990- ), shooting guard in the Israeli Basketball Premier League
 Leo Lyons (1987- ), power forward
 Fred Slaughter (1941-2016), center, sports agent
 Dean Smith (1931-2015), University of North Carolina and Basketball Hall of Fame coach 
 Mark Turgeon (1965- ), head basketball coach at University of Maryland; formerly coach at Texas A&M University
 Kyle Weems (1989- ), small forward

Golf
 Marilynn Smith (1929-2019), pro golfer and LPGA co-founder, member of World Golf Hall of Fame
 Gary Woodland (1984- ), golfer

Racing
 Fred Comer (1893-1928), race car driver 
 Louis Durant (1910-1972), race car driver
 Bruce Hill (1949- ), race car driver

Other

 Bob Benoit (1954- ), pro bowler 
 Casey Converse (1957- ), U.S. Olympic swimmer, coach
 Art Crews (1959- ), pro wrestler 
 Bob Davis (1945- ), sportscaster
 Bill Disney (1932-2009), U.S. Olympic speed skater
 Jack Disney (1930- ), U.S. Olympic cyclist
 Melvin Douglas, Olympic wrestler, 1996 and 2000 and World Championship gold medalist
 Max Falkenstien (1924-2019), radio broadcaster
 Margaret Thompson Murdock (1942- ), member of the Kansas Sports Hall of Fame, and first woman to win a medal in shooting at the Summer Olympics
 Charles Nelson (1933- ), U.S. Olympic volleyball player
 Anna Seaton (1964- ), U.S. Olympic rower

See also

 List of lists of people from Kansas

References

Topeka, Kansas
Topeka